Tverrelvdalen Idrettslag is a Norwegian sports club from Tverrelvdalen, Alta, Finnmark. It has sections for association football, team handball and Nordic skiing.

It was founded on 22 January 1922.

The men's football team currently plays in the Third Division, the fourth tier of Norwegian football. Its current run stretches from 1998 to present.

References

Official site 

Football clubs in Norway
Association football clubs established in 1922
Sport in Finnmark
Alta, Norway
1922 establishments in Norway